The following is a partial list of the "E" codes for Medical Subject Headings (MeSH), as defined by the United States National Library of Medicine (NLM).

This list continues the information at List of MeSH codes (E06). Codes following these are found at List of MeSH codes (F01). For other MeSH codes, see List of MeSH codes.

The source for this content is the set of 2006 MeSH Trees from the NLM.

– equipment and supplies

– amplifiers

– atmosphere exposure chambers

– bandages
  – bandages, hydrocolloid
  – biological dressings
  – occlusive dressings

– bioreactors

– catheters, indwelling

– contraceptive devices
  – contraceptive devices, female
  – condoms, female
  – intrauterine devices
  – intrauterine device expulsion
  – intrauterine devices, medicated
  – intrauterine devices, copper
  – contraceptive devices, male
  – condoms

– culture media
  – culture media, conditioned
  – culture media, serum-free

– dental equipment
  – dental articulators
  – dental devices, home care
  – dental high-speed equipment
  – dental instruments
  – matrix bands
  – rubber dams

– diagnostic equipment
  – endoscopes
  – angioscopes
  – arthroscopes
  – bronchoscopes
  – colposcopes
  – culdoscopes
  – cystoscopes
  – endoscopes, gastrointestinal
  – colonoscopes
  – sigmoidoscopes
  – duodenoscopes
  – esophagoscopes
  – gastroscopes
  – proctoscopes
  – fetoscopes
  – hysteroscopes
  – laparoscopes
  – laryngoscopes
  – mediastinoscopes
  – neuroendoscopes
  – thoracoscopes
  – ureteroscopes
  – flowmeters
  – ophthalmoscopes
  – retinoscopes
  – otoscopes
  – sphygmomanometers
  – blood pressure monitors
  – stethoscopes

– disposable equipment

– durable medical equipment

– electric power supplies
  – bioelectric energy sources

– electrodes
  – defibrillators
  – defibrillators, implantable
  – electrodes, implanted
  – auditory brain stem implants
  – cochlear implants
  – defibrillators, implantable
  – ion-selective electrodes
  – microelectrodes

– emergency medical tags

– equipment and supplies, hospital
  – absorbent pads
  – diapers, adult
  – diapers, infant
  – incontinence pads
  – bedding and linen
  – beds
  – hospitals, packaged
  – incubators, infant
  – patient isolators

– G-suits

– gamma cameras

– gas scavengers

– gastric balloon

– incubators
  – incubators, infant

– infant equipment
  – pacifiers

– infusion pumps
  – infusion pumps, implantable
  – insulin infusion systems

– intermittent pneumatic compression devices

– lasers

– lenses
  – contact lenses
  – contact lenses, hydrophilic
  – contact lenses, extended-wear
  – eyeglasses
  – lenses, intraocular

– medicine chests

– microbubbles

– micropore filters

– microspheres
  – quantum dots

– nebulizers and vaporizers
  – metered dose inhalers
  – inhalation spacers

– needles

– oxygenators
  – oxygenators, membrane

– phantoms, imaging

– prostheses and implants
  – absorbable implants
  – artificial limbs
  – auditory brain stem implant
  – bioprosthesis
  – blood vessel prosthesis
  – bone nails
  – bone plates
  – bone screws
  – breast implants
  – cochlear implants
  – defibrillators, implantable
  – dental implants
  – dental implants, single-tooth
  – dental prosthesis
  – dental abutments
  – dental clasps
  – dental prosthesis, implant-supported
  – dental restoration, permanent
  – crowns
  – inlays
  – dental restoration, temporary
  – dentures
  – denture bases
  – denture, complete
  – denture, complete, immediate
  – denture, complete, lower
  – denture, complete, upper
  – denture liners
  – denture, overlay
  – denture, partial
  – denture, partial, fixed
  – denture, partial, fixed, resin-bonded
  – denture, partial, immediate
  – denture, partial, removable
  – denture, partial, temporary
  – denture precision attachment
  – palatal obturators
  – periodontal prosthesis
  – tooth, artificial
  – eye, artificial
  – glaucoma drainage implants
  – molteno implants
  – heart, artificial
  – heart-assist devices
  – heart valve prosthesis
  – implants, experimental
  – internal fixators
  – joint prosthesis
  – hip prosthesis
  – knee prosthesis
  – larynx, artificial
  – lenses, intraocular
  – maxillofacial prosthesis
  – mandibular prosthesis
  – orbital implants
  – ossicular prosthesis
  – penile prosthesis
  – stents
  – tissue expanders
  – urinary sphincter, artificial
  – vena cava filters

– protective devices
  – air bags
  – ear protective devices
  – eye protective devices
  – head protective devices
  – masks
  – laryngeal masks
  – mouth protectors
  – protective clothing
  – gloves, protective
  – gloves, surgical
  – space suits
  – respiratory protective devices
  – seat belts

– reagent kits, diagnostic
  – reagent strips

– self-help devices
  – communication aids for disabled
  – wheelchairs

– sensory aids
  – hearing aids
  – auditory brain stem implant
  – cochlear implants

– surgical equipment
  – artificial organs
  – artificial limbs
  – bioartificial organs
  – heart, artificial
  – heart-assist devices
  – heart-lung machine
  – infusion pumps
  – infusion pumps, implantable
  – insulin infusion systems
  – kidney, artificial
  – larynx, artificial
  – liver, artificial
  – pacemaker, artificial
  – pancreas, artificial
  – skin, artificial
  – urinary sphincter, artificial
  – chest tubes
  – endoscopes
  – angioscopes
  – arthroscopes
  – bronchoscopes
  – colposcopes
  – culdoscopes
  – cystoscopes
  – endoscopes, gastrointestinal
  – colonoscopes
  – sigmoidoscopes
  – duodenoscopes
  – esophagoscopes
  – gastroscopes
  – proctoscopes
  – fetoscopes
  – hysteroscopes
  – laparoscopes
  – laryngoscopes
  – mediastinoscopes
  – neuroendoscopes
  – thoracoscopes
  – ureteroscopes
  – nebulizers and vaporizers
  – orthopedic equipment
  – artificial limbs
  – canes
  – crutches
  – orthopedic fixation devices
  – bone nails
  – bone plates
  – bone screws
  – bone wires
  – casts, surgical
  – external fixators
  – internal fixators
  – splints
  – orthotic devices
  – braces
  – walkers
  – pessaries
  – surgical instruments
  – obstetrical forceps
  – surgical staplers
  – surgical mesh
  – surgical sponges
  – gelatin sponge, absorbable
  – sutures
  – catgut
  – tampons
  – tissue adhesives
  – tissue expanders
  – trusses

– surgically created structures
  – colonic pouches
  – skeletal muscle ventricle
  – stomas
  – surgical flaps
  – urinary reservoirs, continent

– syringes

– thermometers

– tomography scanners, x-ray computed

– tourniquets

– transducers
  – transducers, pressure

– transplants

– ventilators, mechanical
  – ventilators, negative-pressure

– x-ray film

– x-ray intensifying screens

The list continues at List of MeSH codes (F01).

E07